Angelo Martino Colombo (13 May 1935 – 13 March 2014) was an Italian professional football player.

Honours
 Serie A champion: 1966/67.

References

1935 births
2014 deaths
Italian footballers
Serie A players
F.C. Pro Vercelli 1892 players
A.C.R. Messina players
Cagliari Calcio players
Juventus F.C. players
Hellas Verona F.C. players
Association football goalkeepers
People from Gattinara
Footballers from Piedmont
Sportspeople from the Province of Vercelli